The long-footed rat (Tarsomys apoensis) is a species of rodent in the family Muridae.

It is found only in the highlands of Mindanao, Philippines, including Mount Apo, Mount Kitanglad, and Mount Malindang.

References

Tarsomys
Rats of Asia
Endemic fauna of the Philippines
Fauna of Mindanao
Rodents of the Philippines
Mammals described in 1901
Taxonomy articles created by Polbot